Eagle Harbor Township is a civil township of Keweenaw County in the U.S. state of Michigan.  The population was 308 at the 2020 census.  The township is located on the Keweenaw Peninsula and also includes the southwestern portion of Isle Royale National Park.

Communities
The community was settled when the Copper Falls Mine began operating in 1846. The Arnold Mine soon absorbed the area. The Copper Falls Mine post office began operating on September 10, 1860. The post office was originally in Houghton County to the south until it was transferred to Keweenaw County on September 16, 1861. The post office closed on February 15, 1916. 
It was settled around the Windigo Mine, which was an unsuccessful operation owned by the Wendigo Mining Company from 1890 to 1892. The name was derived from the Wendigo, which was a mythological cannibal that was feared by the local Indians. Windigo is now part of Isle Royale National Park and contains a visitor center, amenities, and seasonal tourism services.

Geography

Including water area, Eagle Harbor Township is the second-largest municipality in the state by total area after McMillan Township in Luce County.

Major highways
 runs briefly through the narrow central portion of the township.
 runs through the township near the Lake Superior Shoreline.

Brockway Mountain Drive is a scenic roadway that runs through the township parallel south of M-28.

Demographics
As of the census of 2000, there were 281 people, 122 households, and 81 families residing in the township.  The population density was 1.6 per square mile (0.6/km2).  There were 488 housing units at an average density of 2.7 per square mile (1.0/km2).  The racial makeup of the township was 96.09% White, 2.14% African American, 0.36% from other races, and 1.42% from two or more races. Hispanic or Latino of any race were 1.42% of the population. 22.6% were of German, 21.8% English, 15.2% Polish, 11.1% Irish and 5.8% French ancestry.

There were 122 households, out of which 4.1% had children under the age of 18 living with them, 60.7% were married couples living together, 3.3% had a female householder with no husband present, and 32.8% were non-families. 30.3% of all households were made up of individuals, and 14.8% had someone living alone who was 65 years of age or older.  The average household size was 1.82 and the average family size was 2.17.

In the township the population was spread out, with 7.1% under the age of 18, 5.3% from 18 to 24, 18.5% from 25 to 44, 44.5% from 45 to 64, and 24.6% who were 65 years of age or older.  The median age was 54 years. For every 100 females, there were 106.6 males.  For every 100 females age 18 and over, there were 110.5 males.

The median income for a household in the township was $38,000, and the median income for a family was $46,250. Males had a median income of $41,250 versus $22,292 for females. The per capita income for the township was $29,091.  None of the families and 3.6% of the population were living below the poverty line.

Education
The entire township is served by the Public Schools of Calumet located to the southwest in the village of Calumet in Houghton County.

Images

Notes

References

Sources

External links
Eagle Harbor Township official website

Townships in Michigan
Townships in Keweenaw County, Michigan
Houghton micropolitan area, Michigan
Michigan populated places on Lake Superior
Populated places established in 1861
1861 establishments in Michigan